Kardanga is a rural locality (a village) in Oshtinskoye Rural Settlement, Vytegorsky District, Vologda Oblast, Russia. The population was 2 as of 2002.

Geography 
Kardanga is located 72 km southwest of Vytegra (the district's administrative centre) by road. Kurvoshsky Pogost is the nearest rural locality.

References 

Rural localities in Vytegorsky District